Ádám Szabó (born 2 January 1988 in Budapest) is a Hungarian football player who currently plays for Putnok VSE. Szabó retired in July 2015.

References 

EUFO
HLSZ
UEFA Official Website
Player profile at MTK Hungaria FC Official Website
Szabó Ádám nem a DVSC-Teva játékosa 

1988 births
Living people
Footballers from Budapest
Hungarian footballers
Hungary youth international footballers
Association football midfielders
MTK Budapest FC players
Mezőkövesdi SE footballers
Putnok VSE footballers
Kazincbarcikai SC footballers
Nemzeti Bajnokság I players